Goran Vojnović (born 11 June 1980) is a Slovenian writer, poet, screenwriter and film director. He is best known for his 2008 novel Southern Scum Go Home which won him numerous awards as well as a lawsuit filed by the Slovenian Police that was withdrawn a day later after media attention and public outrage at police filing charges for a work of fiction brought embarrassment to the Slovenian Ministry of Interior.
 
Vojnović was born in Ljubljana to a family of mixed Bosnian and Jewish descent. He studied at the Academy for Theatre, Radio, Film and Television. He published his first collection of poetry Lep je ta svet in 1998. His novel Čefurji raus! started out as an unfinished film script. It describes life of immigrant youth in the Fužine estate in Ljubljana, their everyday problems and cultural differences between locals and immigrants from the former Yugoslavia. For it he won the Prešeren Foundation Award and the Kresnik Award in 2009. It has been translated and published in Serbian, Croatian, Bosnian, Czech, Romanian and Italian and excerpts translated into German and English.

His novel Jugoslavija, moja dežela (Yugoslavia, My Fatherland) was published in 2011 by Beletrina. The English translation was published in 2015 by Istros Books in the UK. His third novel Figa (The Fig Tree) was translated into English by Istros Books in 2020.

Published works
 Lep je ta svet, self-published poetry collection (1998)
 Čefurji raus! (Southern Scum Go Home!), novel (2008)
 Jugoslavija, moja dežela (Yugoslavia, My Fatherland), novel (2013) 
 Figa (The Fig Tree ), novel (2016)

Works Translated into English 
 Yugoslavia, My Fatherland (Istros Books, London, 2015)
 The Fig Tree (Istros Books, London, 2020)

References

External links 

 Author's page on Istros Books' website (UK publisher)
 Interview with Goran Vojnovic at Eurochannel
 Author's page on Belatrina's website (Slovenian publisher)

Writers from Ljubljana
Living people
Slovenian film directors
Film people from Ljubljana
1980 births
Kresnik Award laureates
University of Ljubljana alumni
Slovenian people of Bosnia and Herzegovina descent
Slovenian people of Croatian descent